Christopher Brook Faulk (born January 21, 1990) is a former American football offensive tackle. He played high school football at Northshore High School in Slidell, Louisiana and college football at LSU. He played in the 2009 U.S. Army All-American Bowl.

College career
Faulk started 16 of 26 games during his career. He missed all but one game of his junior season due to a knee injury.

Faulk entered the 2013 NFL Draft after his junior season.

On July 28, 2014, the Browns waived Faulk after spending the 2013 NFL season on injury reserve after knee surgery

References

External links
 Cleveland Browns bio
 LSU Tigers bio

1990 births
Living people
American football offensive tackles
LSU Tigers football players
Players of American football from Louisiana
People from Slidell, Louisiana